The 2011–12 MŠK Žilina season is the 18th straight season that the club will play in the Slovak First League, the highest tier of football in Slovakia.

Squad 
As of 18 February 2012

Transfers

In

Out

Pre-season and friendlies

Competition

Slovak First Football League

Matches

Slovnaft Cup 11-12

UEFA Europa League

Kickoff times are in CET.

Qualifying rounds

Second qualifying round

Player seasonal records
Competitive matches only. Updated to games played 26 November 2011.

Top scorers

Source: Competitive matches

References

MŠK Žilina seasons
Zilina
Zilina